The purpose of the OpenProjectsFoundation (OPF) is to encourage, assist and support the development of free and open technologies, culture and education. The foundation encourages sharing of knowledge and building of a civil society through instigation of the artistic and technical creativity of young and adult people and:

	Promotes the free independent culture by supporting, encouraging, assisting, financing and organizing creative initiatives in all the areas of art, technologies and education, which have an independent and open character and which present or represent free works of art;
	Spreads and promotes the use of free software and software with open source, free works of art and culture;
	Supports the spread of knowledge, education and information with open and accessible character;
	Encourages and supports civil initiatives with open character, which defend the people's right to have free access to culture, knowledge, technologies and management, and which emphasize the importance of civil society;
	Supports the establishment, development and renovation of culture clubs, reading clubs, libraries, Internet - based data bases with free access and free (open) contents.

References 
 What is OpenSource
 Read more about Free Culture movement

External links 
 OPF website (in Bulgarian)
 C3 - Free Culture Center - The Movie

Organizations based in Bulgaria